State Highway 58 (RJ SH 58) is a State Highway in Rajasthan state of India that connects Jodhpur of Rajasthan with Bheem in Rajsamand district of Rajasthan. The total length of RJ SH 58 is 141.50 km. 

This highway connects NH 65 in Jodhpur to NH 8 in Bheem of Rajsamand district. It meets National Highway 112 in Binawas and National Highway 14 in Sojat.  It also meets RJ SH 63 in Daikra, RJ SH 21 near Binawas and RJ SH 62 in Sojat Road.

Other cities and towns on this highway are: Vinayakiya, kakelav, Rajola Kallan, Chadwas, Rupawas, Sojat, Rendari, Bhaisana, Sojat Road, Kantaliya and Baban.

See also
 List of State Highways in Rajasthan
 Roads in Pali district

References
 State Highway

Transport in Ajmer district
Pali district
Transport in Jodhpur district
Rajsamand district
State Highways in Rajasthan